The Samsung Galaxy A10s is an Android-based smartphone designed, developed and marketed by Samsung Electronics as a part of its Galaxy A series. This phone announced on August 27, 2019. The phone was targeted towards low budget category as this was priced at $143 or INR 10499 at launch.

Design 
The slender 7.8 mm body of Galaxy A10s. The glossy plastic finish stands out all on its own, and you can choose from black, green, blue, or red. It is available in three color options - Green, Blue and Black with HD+ display PLS TFT LCD & Infinity V cutout on the front. The screen sports an auto-adaptive brightness feature. The additional features which also includes rear mounted fingerprint sensor along with face recognition for unlocking the phone & dual camera for photography.

Specification

Hardware 
Samsung Galaxy A10s is a smartphone with a slate-type factor form, the dimensions of A10s is 156.9 x 75.8 x 7.8 mm (6.18 x 2.98 x 0.31 in) weighing 168 g (5.93 oz). The device is equipped with dual sim with support for GSM, HSPA and LTE supporting all 4G bands for connectivity and Wi-Fi 802.11 b/g/n, Wi-Fi Direct, hotspot with Bluetooth 4.2, A2DP, LE support. For navigation GPS with A-GPS, GLONASS, Beidou, GALILEO are supported. It has a microUSB 2.0 & USB On-The-Go support.

It has a 6.2 inch diagonal touchscreen, PLS TFT LCD Infinity V cutout on the front along with rounded corners and 720 x 1520 (HD+) pixel resolution display. The 3900 mAh lithium polymer non-removable battery.

The chipset is powered by a Mediatek MT6762 Helio P22 (12 nm) Octa-core 2.0 GHz Cortex-A53 with GPU PowerVR GE8320 (4 cores at 2.4 GHz + 4 cores at 1.9 GHz). The internal eMMC-type memory 5.1 is 32GB expandable with dedicated microSD card. While Samsung Galaxy A10s comes in dual memory option of 2GB RAM & 3GB RAM.

It has dual camera with main sensor powered by 13 MP, f/1.8, 28mm (wide), AF capable of recording up to 1080p at 30fps & secondary depth 2MP depth sensor with f/2.4. While at the front it has a single 8 MP, f/2.0 with video recording capabilities of 1080p at 30fps.

Software 
Samsung had launched the Galaxy A10s with Android 9 Pie-based One UI. The smartphone received the Android 10 based One UI 2 update in the year 2022 and the Android 11-based on One UI 3 update in Oct-2021.

References 

Samsung Galaxy
Samsung smartphones
Mobile phones introduced in 2019
Android (operating system) devices